Frank Kenneth McWilliams (25 November 1915 – 11 December 1957) was an  Australian rules footballer who played with Geelong in the Victorian Football League (VFL).

Notes

External links 

1915 births
1957 deaths
Australian rules footballers from Victoria (Australia)
Geelong Football Club players
East Geelong Football Club players